Christian Friedrich Ecklon (17 December 1795 – 1 December 1868) was a Danish botanical collector and apothecary. Ecklon is especially known for being an avid collector and researcher of plants in South Africa.

Biography
Ecklon was from Åbenrå, Denmark. He was trained as a pharmacist in Kiel. He first went to South Africa in 1823. During his visit he worked as an apothecary while also looking for plants with medicinal value. Lack of funding and a deteriorating health forced him to live in poor circumstances. When he returned to Europe in 1828, he had collected an extensive herbarium. During his stay in Hamburg from 1833 to 1838, he worked on revising this collection. This herbarium would become the basis for the Flora Capensis (1860–1865) by his friend, Hamburg botanist Otto Wilhelm Sonder (1812–1881) in collaboration with the Irish botanist William Henry Harvey (1811–1866). The herbarium was later sold to Unio Itineraria, a Württemberg Botanical Society which had been organized by botanist Christian Ferdinand Friedrich Hochstetter (1787–1860) and physician Ernst Gottlieb von Steudel (1783–1856).

Ecklon received a travel scholarship from the Danish government and in 1829 he went again to Cape Town where until 1833, together with the German botanist and entomologist, Karl Ludwig Philipp Zeyher (1799–1858), he collected a sizable herbarium, a large part of which was handed over to the University of Copenhagen and the University of Kiel. From 1833-38, he lived in Hamburg and began the publication of descriptions of South African plants in Enumeratio Plantarum Africae Australis Extratropicae, a descriptive catalogue of South African plants in three parts which appeared (1835-37). In 1838 he traveled again to the Cape where he remained until his death in 1868.

Legacy
According to IPNI, Ecklon named a total of 1,974 different genera or species. The genus Ecklonia (a genus of kelp (brown algae) belonging to the family Lessoniaceae), including Ecklon's kelp (Ecklonia biruncinata or E. radiata), as well as Ecklon's Purple Iceplant (Delosperma ecklonis 'Bright Eyes') and Ecklon's Everlasting (Helichrysum ecklonis) were named in his honour. This botanist is denoted by the author abbreviation Eckl. when citing a botanical name.

References

Other Sources
William H. Harvey, Otto Wilhelm Sonder, William Turner Thiselton-Dyer (Editor). Flora Capensis: Being a Systematic Description of the Plants of the Cape Colony, Caffraria, & Port Natal (and Neighbouring Territories) (January 1900); 

1795 births
1868 deaths
People from Aabenraa Municipality
Botanists with author abbreviations
19th-century Danish botanists
Danish entomologists
Danish explorers
Botanists active in Africa